Emigrant Gap is a gap in a ridge on the California Trail as it crosses the Sierra Nevada, to the west of what is now known as Donner Pass. Here the cliffs are so steep that, back in the 1840s, the pioneers on their way to California had to lower their wagons on ropes in order to continue.

The Emigrant Gap was so named because it was a low gap on a ridge where the emigrants' wagons crossed from the American River drainage to the Bear River drainage. It was part of the Truckee Route, a portion of the California Trail by which pioneers, heading west, emigrated from the United States to California, which was part of Mexico until it was captured by the United States in the Mexican–American War (1846–1848).

There is a California historical marker (number 403), dedicated on June 25, 1950, on Interstate 80 commemorating this brave and arduous task.
The spring of 1845 saw the first covered wagons surmount the Sierra Nevada Mountains. They left this valley, ascended to the ridge, and turned westward to old Emigrant Gap. The wagons were lowered by ropes to the floor of Bear Valley. Hundreds followed before, during, and after the gold rush. This was a hazardous portion of the overland emigrant trail.

The small unincorporated community of Emigrant Gap is adjacent to the gap.

The Stephens–Townsend–Murphy Party were the first to cross Emigrant Gap and the Sierra, doing so in 1844–45.

References

External links 
 

History of the Sierra Nevada (United States)
Mountain passes of the Sierra Nevada (United States)
Historic trails and roads in California
Pre-statehood history of California
Lincoln Highway
Rail mountain passes of the United States
Landforms of Placer County, California